SCIS may refer to:

 Schools Catalogue Information Service, Australia
 Scottish Council of Independent Schools, United Kingdom
 Shanghai Community International School, China
 Southern Center for International Studies, United States
 ICAO code for Puerto Sur Airport, Chile

See also
 SCI (disambiguation)